Turda Gorge is a natural reserve (on Hășdate River) situated 6 km west of Turda and about 15 km south-east of Cluj-Napoca, in Transylvania, Romania.

Geography 

The canyon, formed through the erosion of the Jurassic limestone of the mountain, is 2 900 m long and the walls have heights reaching 300 m. The total surface of the canyon is of 324 ha.

Cheile Turzii contain one of the richest and most scenic karst landscapes in Romania. More than 1000 plant and animal species (some of them rare or endangered, like the wild garlic or some species of eagle) live here.

History 
The site has been inhabited since the neolithic.

Flora 
More than 1,000 plant species can be found in the reservation, including Allium obliquum, Dianthus integripetalus, Viola jobi.

Fauna 
67 species of birds, butterflies (Eublema, Heterogynis, Dysauxes, Phybalopterix etc.)  fish, amphibians and some mammals (foxes, weasels, martens, wild boars etc.

Caves 
There are some 60 known caves, almost all of them being of small size (the longest one is 120 m).

Other tourist attractions 

Cheile Turzii are just a few km away from two other canyons (Cheile Turului and Cheile Borzești) as well as from Ciucaș waterfall.

Cheile Turzii is one of the main rock climbing sites in Romania.

Picture gallery

See also 

 Cheile Bicazului
 Salina Turda
 Tourism in Romania
 Huda lui Papara Cave

Notes

Further reading 
 Turda, date istorice, Violeta Nicula, Editura Triade, pag. 64-66

External links 
 Turda Gorges Wallpapers
 Turda tourism
 Cheile Turzii

Turda
Canyons and gorges of Romania
Tourist attractions in Romania
Nature reserves in Romania
Geography of Cluj County
Tourist attractions in Cluj County